Men Like These is a 1932 British drama film directed by Walter Summers and starring John Batten, Sydney Seaward, Syd Crossley, James Enstone and Lesley Wareing.

Plot summary
A number of men are trapped underwater in the L56 submarine and through their comradeship and devotion to duty finally manage to escape.

References

1931 films
1931 drama films
Films shot at British International Pictures Studios
1930s English-language films
Films directed by Walter Summers
British drama films
British black-and-white films
1930s British films